Tony Bradan (born October 6, 1913 - 1999) was a Canadian teacher, guitarist and arranger.

Early life and career
Bradan was born Antonio Alfredo Bradanovich in Ladner, British Columbia, to parents who had immigrated from the Balkans. He studied guitar with Roy Barry and composition with Pasquale Fiore in Vancouver and harmony with John Weinzweig in Toronto. From 1937 to 1942, he was a member of Mart Kenney's Western Gentlemen. During World War II, he was musical director of the Army Show and arranger for the Canadian orchestra of the Allied Expeditionary Forces. After the war, he played in orchestras for Canadian Broadcasting Corporation Toronto. Bradan married singer Judy Richards.

Teaching method
A Learning Process For Playing The Guitar Book 1 and Guitar Fundamentals Books 2, 3, 4 and 5 are based on Bradan's handwritten manuscript. Print copies are in the collection of the Toronto Public Library.

Tony also created an instructional book and accompanying 45 rpm record entitled Basic Guitar Lessons (Silvertone).

Recordings
Bobby Gimby Plays Dixieland

(various recordings) with Mart Kenney and His Western Gentlemen

Les Foster and Five Fabulous Friends

Latin Lustre by Chicho Valle and His Orchestra

CBC Television's Summertime '58, The Tony Bradan Quintet (Sept 11, 1958)

CBC Radio's The Sound of Guitars, Tony Bradan, various other (1963-1968)

Guitariana by Giovanni Liberatore (arranger: Tony Bradan)

Students
Tony's students included George Arvola, Neville Barnes, Gary Benson, Ed Bickert, Larry Chown, Art DeVilliers, Bobby Edwards, Mike Francis, Kenny Gill, Warren Greig, Fergus Hambleton, Peter Harris, Andy Krehm, Ihor Kukurudza, Bill Lechow, John Liberatore, Lorne Lofsky, Michael Maguire, Danny Marks, Rob Martin, Kim Mitchell, James Pett, Jeff  Peacock, Rob Piltch, Whitney Smith, Richard Stewardson, Bruce Todd, Rainer Wiens, Barton Wigg and Dean Zimmerman.

References

 Mart Kenney and His Western Gentlemen by Mart Kenney (1981, Western Producer Prairie Books, Saskatoon, Saskatchewan)
 "The West, a nest, and you, dear" : a bio-discography of Mart Kenney and His Western Gentlemen by Ross Brethour
 Canadian jazz discography, 1916–1980 by Jack Litchfield

External links

Your Technical Queries Answered by Experts. Guitar by Tony Bradan. Full text of "Music World No. 6 Oct. 15 1957"

Canadian jazz guitarists
Canadian male guitarists
1913 births
Year of death missing
Canadian male jazz musicians